Acupalpus djemdjemensis is an insect-eating ground beetle of the genus Acupalpus.

djemdjemensis
Beetles described in 1948